Sims, sims or SIMS may refer to:

Games 
 The Sims, a life simulation video game series
 The Sims (video game), the first installment, released in 2000
 The Sims 2, the second installment, released in 2004
 The Sims 3, the third installment, released in 2009
 The Sims 4, the fourth installment, released in 2014
 SIMS Co., Ltd., a Japanese video game publisher and developer
 Sims (bidding system), a bidding system in contact bridge

Science and computing 
 Secondary ion mass spectrometry, a chemical analysis technique
 Structured Inventory of Malingered Symptomatology, a psychology questionnaire
 Single interface to multiple sources, an ontology-based approach to data integration
 Student information system, computer software for managing student records
 School Information Management System, a student information system by Capita

Companies and organizations 
 SIMS Co., Ltd., a Japanese video game publisher and developer
 Sims Metal Management, a recycling company
 Sims Snowboards
 Services Institute of Medical Sciences, a medical school in Pakistan
 Symbiosis Institute of Management Studies, a business school in India

Places

United States 
 Sims, Illinois, a village
 Sims, North Carolina, a town
 Sims, Texas, a ghost town
 Sims Township, Grant County, Indiana, a township
 Sims, Indiana, an unincorporated community of Sims Township
 Sims Township, Michigan
 Sims High School, former segregated African American high school
 Sims Hotel, Plumerville, Arkansas
 Sims site, an archaeological site in Saint Charles parish, Louisiana

Other 
 Sims Island, Antarctica
 Sims (river), a river of Bavaria, Germany
 Simm (mountain), originally sims, a category of mountain summit in the British Isles

People 
Sims (surname) (includes a list of people with the name)
Sims (rapper), American rapper
Sims Ellison (1967–1995), American guitarist
Sims Stokes (born 1944), American football player

Other uses 
 Plural of sim
 Sims (novel), a book by F. Paul Wilson
 "Sims", a song by Lauv from How I'm Feeling
 USS Sims, several ships with the name

See also 
 Sim (disambiguation)
 Syms (disambiguation)